is a Japanese professional sumo wrestler from Atami. He wrestles for the Isegahama stable and made his debut in November 2020. He won the championships in the two lowest divisions of jonokuchi and jonidan in early 2021. In November 2022 he was promoted to makuuchi, becoming one of the fastest in the history of professional sumo to reach the top division. His highest rank has been maegashira 15.

Early life and sumo beginnings 

Born in Chiba prefecture, Sakutarō Takei moved to Atami in Shizuoka prefecture in his second year of elementary school. He joined a sumo club in the nearby city of Mishima at the age of six. He would then join Nihon University Mishima Junior High School where he was a part of the judo club, before turning to the sumo club during his second year of junior high school. He then transferred to Atami Shiritsu Atami Junior High School before finally transferring to Hiryu High School in Numazu where he was an active member of the sumo club. Upon graduating from high school in November 2020 he joined Isegahama stable.

Career 
Sakutarō was given the shikona "Atamifuji" (熱海富士) by his stablemaster (the 63rd yokozuna Asahifuji) with the "Atami" (熱海) coming from his hometown and "Fuji" (富士) from his stablemaster's ring name. In his professional debut in January 2021, Atamifuji won the jonokuchi championship in a playoff. In the following tournament in March he won the jonidan championship with a perfect 7–0 record. He continued to post strong winning records in the lower divisions, breezing through sandanme and taking only 4 basho in makushita to be promoted to the jūryō division. At the time of his jūryō promotion, Atamifuji had not produced a single losing record.

After suffering his first losing record in his debut tournament as a sekitori in March 2022, Atamifuji would post three straight winning records. He was promoted to the top division Makuuchi for the November 2022 basho. He took only 12 tournaments to reach the top division, which ties him in eighth place for the record of fastest progress to the top division.

Career record

See also 

 Glossary of sumo terms
 List of active sumo wrestlers
 List of sumo record holders

References

External links 

 

2002 births
Living people
Japanese sumo wrestlers